Yucca Valley is an incorporated town in San Bernardino County, California, United States. The population was 20,700 as of the 2010 census.

Government

Municipal
Yucca Valley is governed by a town council. The community's mayor is Jim Schooler. Other town council members are mayor pro tem Rick Denison, Merl Abel, Robert Lombardo and Jeff Drozd.

Yucca Valley contracts its police and public safety services from the San Bernardino County Sheriff's Department. Fire suppression and ambulance services are provided by the San Bernardino County Fire Department and Cal Fire.

State and federal

Education
Public education in Yucca Valley is under the administration of the Morongo Unified School District. Yucca Valley has three neighborhood elementary schools (Onaga Elementary, Yucca Mesa Elementary, and Yucca Valley [Hope] Elementary), one middle school (La Contenta Middle School), and two high schools (Yucca Valley High School and Black Rock Continuation High School).

Private schools in Yucca Valley include Our Lady of the Desert, a Christian school for K–12; Valley Community Chapel School and Daycare offering Preschool, Kindergarten and before and after school Daycare; Joshua Springs Christian School, non-denominational affiliation for PK–12; Grace Christian School, Brethren affiliation for K–12; Hi-Desert SDA Elementary, a 1–6, Seventh Day Adventist affiliation school; and Yucca Valley Christian School, affiliated with The Assembly of God, for PK–12.  Hope Academy lost its charter with the Morongo Unified School District in 2016 and was unable to find another charter and subsequently closed.  Adult tutoring is also available in Yucca Valley, with tutoring information available at the Yucca Valley Public Library.

Transportation
Yucca Valley has two major means of highway access; California State Route 62 (Twentynine Palms Highway) runs east–west and is the main thoroughfare through town and terminates at the south end at Interstate 10 and Parker Dam on the Arizona border at the east end. California State Route 247 (Old Woman Springs Road) begins in Yucca Valley and extends north through Barstow and terminates at Interstate 15. The Morongo Basin Transit Authority (MBTA) serves the area with scheduled bus service around town and the lower desert. The service connects passengers to the Palm Springs International Airport direct bus lines to Los Angeles.  The area is served locally by the Yucca Valley Airport.

Geography and terrain
Yucca Valley lies in the middle of the Morongo Basin at a base elevation of 3,300 feet.  Joshua Tree National Park is adjacent to its southern border.

All of it is land and none of it is covered in water. Yucca Valley is located north of the Joshua Tree National Park, while the Little San Bernardino Mountains and many hills cover a large percentage of city area.

Snowfall occurs almost annually whenever the snow level drops to elevations under . The area's terrain is prone to wildfires (such as the Pioneertown fire in July 2006), resulting from plant growth during the rainy seasons and flash floods. The plants within the town and among the chaparral in the mountains outside of the San Bernardino National Forest wilt and perish from the summer heat, providing ample fuel during a fire.

Geology
Yucca Valley has experienced high levels of seismic activity. Fault lines criss-cross the town and the Morongo basin.

Climate
According to the Köppen Climate Classification system, Yucca Valley has a cold desert climate, abbreviated "BWk" on climate maps.

History

Norman J. Essig was a key player in the late 1950s in working toward establishing Yucca Valley as a place for entertainment celebrities to come and live in privacy. He personally acquired hundreds of acres of land during this time and owned and ran Glenn Realty. He helped to put in the main roads that are running throughout the town off of Hwy 62. He was personal friends with Jimmy Van Heusen the composer and gave him prime real estate in Yucca Valley to build his house which can still be seen atop the highest hill in the center of the town.

In 1992, three large earthquakes occurred near the city, the magnitude 6.1 Joshua Tree earthquake on April 22, and on June 28 the 7.3 Landers and 6.5 Big Bear earthquakes.

On July 11, 2006, a wildfire started by lightning raced through neighboring Pioneertown.

Yucca Valley is home to the geoglyph "Atlatl" by artist Andrew Rogers.

Demographics

2010
The 2010 United States Census reported that Yucca Valley had a population of 20,700. The racial makeup of Yucca Valley was 17,280 (83.5%) White (73.7% Non-Hispanic White), 666 (3.2%) African American, 232 (1.1%) Native American, 469 (2.3%) Asian, 44 (0.2%) Pacific Islander, 1,185 (5.7%) from other races, and 824 (4.0%) from two or more races. Hispanic or Latino of any race were 3,679 persons (17.8%).

The Census reported that 20,481 people (98.9% of the population) lived in households, 166 (0.8%) lived in non-institutionalized group quarters, and 53 (0.3%) were institutionalized.

There were 8,274 households, out of which 2,512 (30.4%) had children under the age of 18 living in them, 3,661 (44.2%) were opposite-sex married couples living together, 1,116 (13.5%) had a female householder with no husband present, 477 (5.8%) had a male householder with no wife present.  There were 604 (7.3%) unmarried opposite-sex partnerships, and 83 (1.0%) same-sex married couples or partnerships. 2,387 households (28.8%) were made up of individuals, and 1,163 (14.1%) had someone living alone who was 65 years of age or older. The average household size was 2.48.  There were 5,254 families (63.5% of all households); the average family size was 3.03.

The population was spread out, with 4,937 people (23.9%) under the age of 18, 1,772 people (8.6%) aged 18 to 24, 4,676 people (22.6%) aged 25 to 44, 5,495 people (26.5%) aged 45 to 64, and 3,820 people (18.5%) who were 65 years of age or older.  The median age was 40.6 years. For every 100 females, there were 94.7 males.  For every 100 females age 18 and over, there were 91.1 males.

The homeowner vacancy rate was 4.6%; the rental vacancy rate was 9.6%.  12,220 people (59.0% of the population) lived in owner-occupied housing units and 8,261 people (39.9%) lived in rental housing units.

According to the 2010 United States Census, Yucca Valley had a median household income of $42,962, with 17.0% of the population living below the federal poverty line.

2000
As of the census of 2000, there were 16,865 people, 6,949 households, and 4,489 families residing in the town. The racial makeup of the town was 87.3% White, 2.3% African American, 1.4% Native American, 1.3% Asian, 0.3% Pacific Islander, 4.6% from other races, and 3.0% from two or more races. Hispanic or Latino of any race were 11.4% of the population.

There were 6,949 households, out of which 27.9% had children under the age of 18 living with them, 47.1% were married couples living together, 13.0% had a female householder with no husband present, and 35.4% were non-families. 30.0% of all households were made up of individuals, and 16.5% had someone living alone who was 65 years of age or older.  The average household size was 2.4 and the average family size was 2.9.

In the town 25.1% of the population was under the age of 18, 7.1% from 18 to 24, 22.6% from 25 to 44, 22.4% from 45 to 64, and 22.8% who were 65 years of age or older. The average number in the US over 65 was 12.4%.   The median age was 42 years, at a time when the average age in the US was 35.3.  For every 100 females, there were 90.7 males.  For every 100 females age 18 and over, there were 85.1 males.

Economy

Personal income
The median income for a household in the town was $30,420, and the median income for a family was $36,650. Males had a median income of $35,037 versus $25,234 for females. The per capita income for the town was $16,020, lower than most of Southern California.  About 16.2% of families and 19.5% of the population were below the poverty line, including 27.3% of those under age 18 and 9.3% of those age 65 or over.

Tourism

The town borders Joshua Tree National Park.

Old Town Yucca Valley is located on Highway 62 at the intersection of Pioneertown Road 

Amenities include a bowling alley, various retail stores and an "Old Town" area. The Sky Village weekend open-air market is another popular attraction.

On Grubstakes Day, held the day before Memorial Day, there is a parade.

The Desert Christ Park sculpture garden is located here.

The California Welcome Center is located at 56711 Twentynine Palms Highway in Yucca Valley and provides information on where to stay, eat and play while in the area.

Employment
Yucca Valley has the Twentynine Palms Base (US Marine Corps) 20 miles to the east and the Morongo Basin is home to temporary residents who work on the base.

Media 
Yucca Valley is served by the bi-weekly Hi Desert Star newspaper.

There are several commercial radio stations with studios located in the Coachella Valley (Palm Springs) with local broadcast signals located in the Morongo Basin.
 91.7 KHCS (Christian) broadcasts on 92.1,
 92.1 KXCM (country) broadcasts on 96.3,
 94.3 KNWZ "K-News" on 103.7 FM and 1250 AM,
 106.9 KDGL (70s-90s hits) 
 106.1 KPLM (country)

There is one local station on 107.7 KCDZ (z107) with studios located in Joshua Tree.

There are several county run television repeaters (from Palm Springs, Riverside/San Bernardino and Greater Los Angeles) broadcasting from Pinto Mountain south of Twentynine Palms that can be received in the Yucca Mesa area but not in the city proper. Television service (and high speed cable internet) in town is provided by Charter Spectrum. WISP (wireless internet service provider) is offered from Mojave WiFi, Frontier and Flashbyte Digital.

References

External links

 
 Yucca Valley Chamber of Commerce

 
1971 establishments in California
Cities in San Bernardino County, California
Incorporated cities and towns in California
Populated places in the Mojave Desert
Populated places established in 1971